Bina is an extinct Austronesian language of Papua New Guinea. It was restructured through contact with neighboring Papuan languages, and it turn influencing them, before speakers shifted to those languages.

See also
Magori language, a similar situation

References

Central Papuan Tip languages
Languages of Central Province (Papua New Guinea)
Extinct languages of Papua New Guinea
Languages extinct in the 1980s